Betren is a village located in the municipality of Vielha e Mijaran, in the Val d'Aran.

References 

Populated places in Val d'Aran